Elio Altramura (died 2004) was an Italian art director. He won an Oscar in the category Best Art Direction for the film A Room with a View.

Selected filmography
 A Room with a View (1985)

References

External links

Italian art directors
Best Art Direction Academy Award winners
Year of birth missing
2004 deaths